Paige Meade (born 18 January 1993) better known by her stage name Paigey Cakey is an English MC, singer and actress, from Hackney, London. In an interview with the MOBOs she revealed that "Cakey" was a childhood nickname, that referred to her perceived wealth. She released her first mixtape in 2012 entitled The First Paige. Her third mixtape The Right Paige featured Yungen, Young Spray, Sneakbo, Stormzy, Chip, Snap Capone, Colours and Dubz. She released an EP entitled 'Red' in early 2016 and 'Red Velvet' a mixtape which she released as a Christmas Gift to her fans on 25 December 2016.

Some of Paigey's hit songs are "Boogie", "Nana" (featuring Geko) and "Down".

Paige had her first tour in 2017, located in Birmingham and London.

Paige competed in Loaded in Paradise in 2022/23 which aired on ITV

Acting career 
In 2011, Cakey played the character Dimples in award-winning film Attack the Block, and the role of Kelly in 2012 film The Knot.

Between 2012 and 2013, she played the role of Jade Fleming in the BBC One school-based drama series, Waterloo Road, and performed a freestyle-rap for the series. The rap was focused on the decision whether to keep her baby.

In 2014, she played the character Kelly in BBC One Series The Secrets and the role of Tamara in 2015 film Legacy. In 2018 she played the role of battle rapper Miss Quotes in the film Vs.

She played Imani in The Wright Brothers, a theatre production in 2020.

Personal life 
Cakey is bisexual.

Filmography 
 2011 – Attack the Block – Dimples
 2012 – The Knot – Kelly
 2012 – 2013 – Waterloo Road – Jade
 2014 – The Secrets – Kelly
 2015 – Legacy – Tamara
 2018 – Vs. – Miss Quotes
 2019 – Lotto
 2019 – An I Oop
 2018- Intent 2

Discography 
 The First Paige (2012)
 The Next Paige (2013)
 The Right Paige (2014)
 Red (2016)
 Red Velvet Mixtape (2016)
 Flavors (2019)

References

External links
 

1993 births
Living people
Bisexual singers
Black British actresses
Black British women rappers
21st-century Black British women singers
English television actresses
LGBT Black British people
English LGBT singers
English LGBT actors
LGBT rappers
People from Hackney Central
Rappers from London
20th-century English LGBT people
21st-century English LGBT people